Luxeuil Abbey, the Abbaye Saint-Pierre et Saint-Paul, was one of the oldest and best-known monasteries in Burgundy, located in what is now the département of Haute-Saône in Franche-Comté, France.

History

Columbanus
It was founded circa 590 by the Irish missionary Saint Columbanus. Columbanus and his companions first settled in cells at Annegray, in the commune of Voivre, Haute-Saône. Looking for a more permanent site for his community, Columbanus decided upon the ruins of a well-fortified Gallo-Roman settlement, Luxovium, about eight miles away. The Roman town had been ravaged by Attila in 451, and was now buried in the dense overgrown woodland that had filled the abandoned site over more than a century, but the place still had the advantage of the thermal baths ("constructed with unusual skill", according to Columbanus' early biographer, Jonas of Bobbio) down in the valley, which still give the town its name of Luxeuil-les-Bains. Jonas described it further: "There stone images crowded the nearby woods, which were honoured in the miserable cult and profane former rites in the time of the pagans".

With a grant from an officer of the palace at Childebert's court, an abbey church was built with a sense of triumph within the heathen site and its "spectral haunts".

Under the intellectual and spiritual stimulation of the Irish monks, the abbey at Luxeuil, dedicated to Saint Peter, soon became the most important and flourishing monastery in Gaul. The community was so large that choir followed choir in the chanting of the office, and at Luxeuil the laus perennis imported from Agaunum went on day and night.

Most of the earliest rule that was observed at Luxeuil derived from Celtic monastic traditions, whether or not written down by Columbanus, supplemented increasingly by the more formalized Benedictine Rule that was followed throughout the West, which provided for the abbot's orderly election, his relations with his monks, and the appointment of monastic officials and their delegated powers. In 603, a synod accused Columbanus of keeping Easter by the Celtic date, but his severity and the inflexible rule he had established may have been the true cause of friction with the Burgundian court.

Eustace of Luxeuil
Columbanus was exiled from Luxeuil by Theuderic II of Austrasia and the dowager Queen Brunehaut. He was succeeded as abbot by Saint Eustace of Luxeuil, the head of the monastic school, which under Eustace and his successor Saint Waldebert, established a high reputation. The extensive library and the great scriptorium are first attested under Abbot Waldebert (629–670).

The school and example of Luxeuil contributed significantly to the conversion of the Burgundians. Luxeuil sent out monks to found houses at Bobbio, between Milan and Genoa, where Columbanus himself became abbot, and monasteries at Saint-Valéry and Remiremont. To Luxeuil came such monks as Conon, abbot of Lérins Abbey to prepare for the reform of his monastery, and Saints Wandregisel and Philibert, founders respectively of the abbeys of Fontenelle and Jumièges in Normandy, who spent years in studying the rule observed in monasteries which derived their origin from Luxeuil.

Saracen, Viking and Hungarian raids
About 732, a raiding party of Moors under the  skillful general Abdul Rahman Al Ghafiqi, governor of Al-Andalus, penetrating from Arles deep into Burgundy, briefly took possession of Luxeuil and massacred most of the community, including Abbot Mellinus. The few survivors rebuilt the abbey. In 816, under the reforming government of the eighteenth abbot, Saint Ansegisus, the Emperor Louis the Pious renewed its charters, restored the church and monastic buildings, and reformed discipline. The monastery and the small town that clustered around its walls were devastated by the Vikings in about 886.  In 917, it was sacked by the Hungarians.

Modern period
From the 15th century the institution of non-resident commendatory abbots encouraged the decline of discipline. The Emperor Charles V curtailed the power of Luxeuil's abbots.

In 1634, however, the commendatory abbots ceased, and Luxeuil was joined to the reformed Congregation of St. Vanne. From the report of the "Commission des Réguliers", drawn up in 1768, the community appears to have been numerous and flourishing, and discipline well kept.

French Revolution
At the French Revolution the monks were dispersed. Most of the abbey's site is built over by the modern town, but the fine Gothic church, built in the 14th century, was not destroyed; neither were the cloisters and conventual buildings, which until the "Association Laws" of 1901 were used as a seminary for the diocese of Besançon, and still remain in existence. The church itself has for many years served as the parish church of Luxeuil-les-Bains.

List of abbots
For a list of abbots, see Henri Baumont, Étude historique sur l'abbaye de Luxeuil (590–1790) (Luxeuil, 1895), appendix I.

 590–610 : St Columbanus
 610–625 : Eustace
 625–670 : St Waldebert
 670–6?? : Vindologus
 6??–665 : Berthoald
 665–682 : Ingofrid
 682–6?? : Cunctan
 6??–6?? : Rusticus
 6??–700 : Sayfrocius (Sayfarius)
 700–7?? : Ado
 7??–7?? : Arulf
 7??–7?? : Rendinus
 7??–7?? : Regnebert
 7??–7?? : Gerard I
 7??–7?? : Ratto
 7??–730 : Vinlincrannus (Vuikeranus)
 730–731 : St Mellinus
 731–746 : vacancy
 746–7?? : Frudoald
 7??–7?? : Gaylembus
 7??–764 : Airibrand
 764–7?? : Boso
 7??–785 : Grimoald
 785–786 : Andrew I
 786–7?? : Docto
 7??–8?? : Siliernus
 8??–817 : Dadinus
 817–834 : St Ansegisus
 834–834 : Drogo
 834–855 : Fulbert
 856–888 : St Gibart
 ???–??? : Eudes I
 948–983 : Guy I
 983–1018 : Aalongus
 1018–10?? : Milo
 10??–1049 : William I
 1049–10?? : Gerard II
 10??–10?? : Roger
 10??–10?? : Robert
 10??–10?? : Guy II
 1090–1023 : Thibaud I
 1123–1136 : Hugh I
 1136–1139 : Josserand
 1139–1147 : Stephen I
 1147–1160 : Gerard III
 1160–1165 : Peter I
 1165–1178 : Sifroi
 1178–1186 : Bouchard
 1186–1189 : Gerard IV
 1189–1201 : Olivier d'Abbans
 1201–1204 : Frederick
 1204–1209 : Hervé
 1209–1219 : Hugh II
 1219–1234 : Simon
 1234–1265 : Thibaud II
 1265–12?? : Régnier
 12??–1271 : Hugh III
 1271–1287 : Charles I
 1287–1308 : Thibaud III de Faucogney
 1308–1314 : Stephen II
 1314–1319 : vacancy
 1319–1345 : Eudes II de Châtillon
 1345–1351 : Fromond de Corcondray
 1351–1363 : Guillaume II de Saint-Germain
 1364–1382 : Aymon de Mollans
 1382–1416 : Guillaume III de Bussul
 1416–1416 : Pierre II de Lugney
 1416–1424 : Étienne III Pierrecy de L'Isle
 1424–1427 : Guy III Pierrecy de L'Isle
 1427–1431 : Jean I d'Ungelles
 1431–1449 : Guy IV Briffaut
 1449–1468 : Jean II Jouffroy
 1468–1495 : Antoine I de Neuchâtel
 1495–1533 : Jean III de La Palud de Varambon
 1534–1541 : François I de La Palud de Varambon
 1542–1560 : François II Bonvalot
 1560–1586 : Antoine II Perrenot de Granvelle
 1587–1600 : Louis de Madruce
 1600–1601 : André II d'Autriche
 1601–1622 : Antoine III de La Baume
 1622–1631 : Philippe de La Baume
 1633–1642 : Jérôme Coquelin
 1642–1671 : Jean–Baptiste Ier Clerc
 1671–1671 : Claude–Paul de Bauffremont
 1671–1671 : Emmanuel Privey
 1671–1680 : Jean–Baptiste II Joseph-Hyacinthe de Bauffremont
 1680–1733 : Charles II  Emmanuel de Bauffremont
 1733–1741 : vacancy
 1741–1743 : René de Rohan-Soubise
 1743–1790 : Jean IV Louis-Aynard de Clermont-Tonnerre

See also

List of Merovingian monasteries
Merovingian architecture
Merovingian art

Notes

External links
 Catholic Encyclopedia article: Luxeuil
  Northvegr: Roman ruins of the baths at Luxeuil

Benedictine monasteries in France
Merovingian architecture
Christian monasteries established in the 6th century
Buildings and structures in Haute-Saône
Irish monastic foundations in continental Europe
Churches in Haute-Saône